Borgoy is a rural locality (a selo) in Dzhidinsky District, Republic of Buryatia, Russia. The population was 527 as of 2017. There are 10 streets.

Geography 
Borgoy is located 43 km northwest of Petropavlovka (the district's administrative centre) by road. Inzagatuy is the nearest rural locality.

References 

Rural localities in Dzhidinsky District